David Meskhi is a photographer based in Berlin, Germany. He was born in 1979 in Tbilisi, Georgia. After gaining a master's degree in Hydro ecology, Meskhi decided to change his profession entirely and turned to art. He received an Academic Degree in Photo Journalism at Shota Rustaveli Theatre and Film State University, Tbilisi, Georgia. In 2008, Meskhi was invited to photograph the Georgian Olympic Team.

Career 
Since 2004, Meskhi has been working as a photographer and photojournalist for several magazines, and his artworks have been exhibited in Georgia, Germany, France, Austria, Israel, Russia and the UK. In 2013-2015 he co-directed a documentary “When the Earth Seems to be Light” with Salome Machaidze and Tamuna Karumidze, which is based on his photographs.

References

1979 births
Living people
Photographers from Georgia (country)
Artists from Tbilisi